The Parliamentary Boundaries Act 1832 was an Act of the Parliament of the United Kingdom which defined the parliamentary divisions (constituencies) in England and Wales required by the Reform Act 1832. The boundaries were largely those recommended by a boundary commission headed by the surveyor Thomas Drummond.

Provisions
Sections 1 to 25 of the Act defined the divisions of those larger counties of England which under the Reform Act were to be divided into two divisions.  This did not include the seven counties which were to return three members each.
 
Sections 26 and 27 and Schedule M dealt with detached parts of counties.  It provided that most detached parts (identified in Schedule M) were to form part of the parliamentary county and division in which they were geographically located, rather than of the county to which they otherwise formed a part.  Section 28 provided that liberties and other places with a separate jurisdiction (but not the counties corporate of Bristol, Exeter, Lichfield, Norwich, or Nottingham) were to be included in the county and division in which they were geographically located.

Sections 29 to 34 prescribed polling districts and polling places within each constituency.

Sections 35 to 37 and Schedule O defined the boundaries of each parliamentary borough.  In ancient boroughs these replaced boundaries established by charter or prescription, often centuries out of date. The commissioners favoured rational boundaries, encompassing an urban centre with some suburban room for growth. However, some of the smaller boroughs to escape disfranchisement were given large rural tracts to increase the represented population.

See also
List of constituencies enfranchised and disfranchised by the Reform Act 1832

References

Footnote

Sources

Further reading
 Reports of Boundary Commissioners covering England and Wales :
 Eight volumes on boroughs (text from HathiTrust)
 One volume on county divisions (text from HathiTrust)
 Zoomable map (from Vision of Britain) — links to high-resolution scans of the maps associated with the preceding nine volumes

External links 
 Text of the Act

United Kingdom Acts of Parliament 1832
1832 in British law
Representation of the People Acts
1832 in politics
Constituencies of the Parliament of the United Kingdom (historic)

Historic counties of Wales